Shritha Sivadas is an actress and television presenter who works in Malayalam and Tamil-language films. She made her debut in Sugeeth's Ordinary (2012). After long time she made a comeback  through Dhilluku Dhuddu 2 in 2019.

Personal life

Shritha was born as Parvathy to Shivadas and Uma. She hails from Uliyannoor in Aluva, Kerala, and graduated in Microbiology from the Sree Sankara College,

Career

Shritha started her career as an anchor for the programme named Dew Drops in Kairali, and went on to anchor Kairali TV's Tharolsavam. Sugeeth's Ordinary (2012) marked her acting debut, after which she was referred to as the "Gavi Girl" by the audience and in the media. She was then seen in a guest role in a song sequence with Asif Ali in Scene Onnu Nammude Veedu. In the suspense thriller 10:30 am Local Call she played a girl called Nimmi. Her next release was Money Back Policy, directed by Jayaraj Vijay. March 2013, Shritha stated that she had decided to move on to the Tamil film industry, citing: "Honestly, I am not happy with the roles that are offered here (Malayalam)". Despite that statement, she signed several films in Malayalams including Hangover, Rasputin  Weeping Boy, Koothara and Onnum Mindathe.

Filmography

Television

References

External links
 Official website
 

Living people
Indian film actresses
1991 births
Actresses from Kochi
Actresses in Malayalam cinema
People from Aluva
21st-century Indian actresses
Indian television actresses
Actresses in Malayalam television
Actresses in Tamil cinema
Actresses in Tamil television